Taofiq Jibril (born 23 April 1998) is a Nigerian footballer who currently plays as a forward for Ararat-Armenia.

Career
On 12 January 2023, Armenian Premier League club Ararat-Armenia announced the signing of Jibril.

Career statistics

Club

References

1998 births
Living people
Sportspeople from Kaduna
Nigerian footballers
Nigerian expatriate footballers
Nigerian Christians
Association football forwards
Portimonense S.C. players
Primeira Liga players
Campeonato de Portugal (league) players
MŠK Žilina players
FC ViOn Zlaté Moravce players
Slovak Super Liga players
Nigerian expatriate sportspeople in Portugal
Expatriate footballers in Portugal
Nigerian expatriate sportspeople in Slovakia
Expatriate footballers in Slovakia